Thomas De Koninck (born 1934 in Leuven, Belgium) is a philosopher from Québec.

After studying at Oxford (M.A.), Université Laval (Ph.D), and Freie Universität Berlin, he became professor at University of Notre Dame (1960–1964) in the United States and at Université Laval (1964– ) in Québec. A well-known rumor  posits that as a child he inspired Antoine de Saint-Exupéry's character The Little Prince when Saint-Exupéry was living in the house of his father, Charles De Koninck, in Québec City, in 1942.

Books by Thomas De Koninck 

Urgence de la philosophie : actes du Colloque du cinquantenaire de la Faculté, Université Laval, 1985, with Lucien Morin (ed.), Québec, Les Presses de l'Université Laval, 1985.
La question de Dieu selon Aristote et Hegel, with Guy-Planty Bonjour (ed.), Paris, PUF, 1991.
De la dignité humaine, Paris, PUF, "Quadrige", 1995, 2nd ed. in 2002 (Prize "La Bruyère" of the Académie française, 1996) - Spanish translation.
 Actes du colloque "Sens et Savoir" (ed.), Laval théologique et philosophique, vol. 52, num. 2, June 1996, 615 pages.
 Actes du colloque international Descartes, with Jean-Luc Marion and Jean-Marc Narbonne (org.), Laval théologique et philosophique, vol. 53, num. 3, October 1997.
La nouvelle ignorance et le problème de la culture, Paris, PUF, "Intervention philosophique", 2000 - Portuguese, Turkish, Romanian and Arabic translations.
 La question de Dieu (ed.), Laval théologique et philosophique, vol. 58, num. 3, October 2002.
Philosophie de l'éducation. Essai sur le devenir humain, Paris, PUF, "Thémis", 2004 - Portuguese translation.
La dignité humaine. Philosophie, droit, politique, économie, médecine, with Gilbert Larochelle (ed.), Paris, PUF, 2005.
Relire Platon (ed.), Laval théologique et philosophique, vol. 62, num. 2, June 2006.
La crise de l’éducation, Montréal, Fides, 2007.
Aristote, l'intelligence et Dieu, Paris, PUF, Chaire Étienne Gilson, 2008.
Philosophie de l'éducation pour l'avenir, Québec, Les Presses de l'Université Laval, 2010.
Questions ultimes, Ottawa, Les Presses de l'Université d'Ottawa, "Philosophica", 2012 (Prize of the Canadian Philosophical Association, 2013).
La foi est-elle irrationnelle ?, with Louis Roy, Montréal, Fides, 2013.
À quoi sert la philosophie ?, Paris/Québec, Hermann/Les Presses de l'Université Laval, 2015.
 Dignité de la personne et primauté du bien commun, Saarbrücken, Éditions universitaires européennes, 2016.
 Beauty obliges. Ecology and dignity (english translation), with J.-F. de Raymond, Québec, Presses de l'Université Laval, 2018.

Books and papers on Thomas De Koninck 

Pierre-Alexandre Fradet, Le désir du réel dans la philosophie québécoise, Montréal, Nota bene, coll. Territoires philosophiques, 2022, 246 p.
 Thierry Bissonnette, Thomas De Koninck, attiseur de consciences, Montréal, Varia, 2007.
  Jean-François Mattéi and Jean-Marc Narbonne (ed.), La transcendance de l'homme : études en hommage à Thomas De Koninck, Québec, Les Presses de l'Université Laval, 2012 - with contributions of Jean-François Mattéi, Jean-Marc Narbonne, Jean-Luc Marion, Chantal Delsol, Leslie Armour, Luc Langlois, Jean-François de Raymond, Gilbert Larochelle, Yves Charles Zarka, Gabor Csepregi, Rémi Brague, Dominique Folscheid et Jean-Jacques Wunenburger.
 Sigal Samuel, "Hunting for the Little Prince", The Rumpus, June 14, 2014, online : http://therumpus.net/2014/06/hunting-for-the-little-prince/
 Pierre-Alexandre Fradet, "Un humanisme de l'au-delà : sens commun et puissance spéculative chez Thomas De Koninck", Science et Esprit, vol. 66, num. 3, Falls 2014, pp. 379–394, available online : https://www.academia.edu/8398629/_Un_humanisme_de_lau-delà_sens_commun_et_puissance_spéculative_chez_Thomas_De_Koninck_Science_et_Esprit_66_3_septembre_2014_p._379-394

Honors 
Rhodes Scholarship (1956-1959)
Alexander von Humboldt Foundation (1972-1973, and 1990)
Prize La Bruyère of l'Académie française for De la dignité humaine (1996)
Member of the Ordre des Palmes académiques, France (1996)
"Popular Prof" in the Maclean's Guide to Canadian Universities (1999)
Member of l'Académie des lettres et sciences humaines of the Royal Society of Canada (2002)
Prize of excellence in teaching of the Université Laval (2002)
Owner of the "Chaire de recherche et d'enseignement La philosophie dans le monde actuel" of the Université Laval (2004 - )
Member of the Order of Canada (2005)
Owner of the "Chaire Étienne Gilson", Paris (2007-2008)
"Médaille Gloire de l'Escolle" of l'Université Laval (2010)
Prize of the Canadian Philosophical Association for Questions ultimes (2013)

References

External links 
Papers of Thomas De Koninck on Philpapers: http://philpapers.org/s/Thomas%20De%20Koninck
Curriculum vitae of Thomas De Koninck: http://www.philomondeactuel.chaire.ulaval.ca/presentation/titulaire/

1934 births
Living people
Canadian philosophers
Catholic philosophers
Members of the Order of Canada
Academic staff of Université Laval
Presidents of the Canadian Philosophical Association
Université Laval alumni